Superman is an ongoing American comic book series featuring the DC Comics superhero Superman as its protagonist. Superman began as one of several anthology features in the National Periodical Publications comic book Action Comics #1 in June 1938. The strip proved so popular that National launched Superman into his own self-titled comic book, the first for any superhero, premiering with the cover date Summer 1939. Between 1986 and 2006 it was retitled, The Adventures of Superman, while a new series used the title Superman. In May 2006, it was returned to its original title and numbering. The title was canceled with issue #714 in 2011, and was relaunched with issue #1 the following month which ended its run in 2016. A fourth series was released in June 2016 and ended in April 2018, while the fifth series was launched in July 2018 and ended in June 2021. The series was replaced by Superman: Son of Kal-El in July 2021, featuring adventures of Superman's son, Jon Kent. A sixth Superman series was released in February 2023.

Publication history

Superman volume 1
Due to the Superman character's popularity after his premiere in Action Comics #1, National Allied Publications decided to launch an entirely new magazine featuring a single character, which at that time was unprecedented. Superman #1 appeared on the shelves in the summer of 1939. Superman now also had the distinction of being the first ever hero-character featured in more than one comic magazine. By issue #7, Superman was being hailed on the covers as the "World's Greatest Adventure Strip Character". Perry White, a supporting character who had originated on the Superman radio program was introduced into the comic book in issue #7 (October 1940). Editor Mort Weisinger began his long association with the title with issue #11 (July–August 1941). Jimmy Olsen first appeared as a named character in the story "Superman versus The Archer" in Superman #13 (Nov.–Dec. 1941). In the early 1940s, Superman was selling over a million copies per month. By 1942, artist Wayne Boring, who had previously been one of Shuster's assistants, had become a major artist on Superman. Superman #23 (July–August 1943) featured the first Superman comic book story written by someone other than Jerry Siegel. The story "America's Secret Weapon!" was written by Don Cameron despite bearing Siegel's signature. Siegel introduced Mister Mxyzptlk in issue #30 (September 1944). A more detailed origin story for Superman was presented in issue #53 (July 1948) to mark the character's tenth anniversary. Another part of the Superman mythos which had originated on the radio program made its way into the comic books when kryptonite was featured in a story by Bill Finger and Al Plastino.

Superman was the first DC title with a letters column as a regular feature beginning with issue #124 (September 1958). In the view of comics historian Les Daniels, artist Curt Swan became the definitive artist of Superman in the early 1960s with a "new look" to the character that replaced Wayne Boring's version. Writer Jim Shooter and Swan crafted the story "Superman's Race With the Flash!" in Superman #199 (Aug. 1967) which featured the first race between the Flash and Superman, two characters known for their super-speed powers.

Julius Schwartz became the title's editor with issue #233 (January 1971) and together with writer Denny O'Neil and artist Curt Swan streamlined the Superman mythos, starting with the elimination of Kryptonite. Elliot S. Maggin began his long association with the title with the story "Must There Be a Superman?" in issue #247 (Jan. 1972). Writer Cary Bates, in collaboration with Swan, introduced such characters as the supervillain Terra-Man in issue #249 (March 1972) and the superhero Vartox in issue #281 (Nov. 1974). Issues #272 (Feb. 1974), #278 (Aug. 1974), and #284 (Feb. 1975) of the series were in the 100 Page Super Spectacular format. Superman #300 (June 1976) featured an out-of-continuity story by Bates and Maggin which imagined the infant Superman landing on Earth in 1976 and becoming a superhero in 2001. The tale was an inspiration for Mark Millar's Superman: Red Son limited series published in 2003. DC's parent company Warner Communications reinstated the byline for Jerry Siegel and Joe Shuster which had been dropped decades earlier and the first issue with the restored credit was Superman #301 (August 1976). Martin Pasko and Swan created the Master Jailer character in issue #331 (January 1979). The bottle city of Kandor, which had been introduced in 1958, was restored to normal size in a story by Len Wein and Swan in Superman #338 (August 1979).

The series reached issue #400 in October 1984. That issue featured work by several popular comics artists including the only major DC work by Jim Steranko as well as an introduction by noted science-fiction author Ray Bradbury. Superman ran uninterrupted until the mid-1980s, when DC Comics instituted a line-wide relaunch with the 1985 event maxi-series Crisis on Infinite Earths. Folding their vast multiverse into a single shared universe, Superman and his supporting cast would receive a massive overhaul at the hands of writer/artist John Byrne. One last story, which also marked the end of Schwartz's tenure as editor of the series, was published to give a send-off to the former status quo: Alan Moore's Whatever Happened to the Man of Tomorrow? The story's first part saw publication in Superman #423, which would be the last issue before the title was relaunched with its legacy numbering as The Adventures of Superman. Superman was relaunched with a new #1 issue in a second volume in 1986, and was published concurrently with The Adventures of Superman.

1986 revamp

The Adventures of Superman was numbered from issue #424 (January 1987) to issue #649 (April 2006), for a total of 228 monthly issues including issue #0 (October 1994) published between issues #516 and #517 as a tie-in to the Zero Hour limited series and issue #1,000,000 (November 1998) as a tie-in to the DC One Million limited series and nine Annuals published between 1987 and 1997.

When the series was relaunched in late 1986 under its new title, the creative team initially was writer Marv Wolfman and artist Jerry Ordway. John Byrne replaced Wolfman with issue #436 (January 1988) and Ordway became both writer and artist with issue #445 (October 1988). Writer/artist Dan Jurgens worked on the title from 1989–1991. Hank Henshaw, a character who would later become the Cyborg Superman, first appeared in issue #466 (May 1990). By the late 1980s, the plots of the Superman books were often linked. To coordinate the storyline and sequence of event, from January 1991 to January 2002, "triangle numbers" (or "shield numbers") appeared on the cover of each Superman comic book. During these years, the Superman storylines ran with the story continuing through the titles Superman, Action Comics and later in two further series, Superman: The Man of Steel and Superman: The Man of Tomorrow.

Jerry Ordway returned as writer of the title with issue #480 (July 1991). Tom Grummett drew part of #480 and became the main artist on the series with the following issue. The series participated in the crossover storyline "Panic in the Sky" in 1992. During their run on The Adventures of Superman, Grummett and Ordway (along with editor Mike Carlin and others) were the architects of "The Death of Superman" storyline, in which Superman died and was resurrected. It was during that storyline, that Grummett and writer Karl Kesel, created the new Superboy in The Adventures of Superman #500 (June 1993). Other crossovers the series participated in included Zero Hour: Crisis in Time, The Final Night, and Infinite Crisis.

As of the start of 2002, the integration between the Superman titles became less frequent, and the remaining issues of The Adventures of Superman commonly carried self-contained stories. Issue #600 (March 2002) was a double-sized special featuring Superman combating Lex Luthor. The final issue (#649) was part of a three-part crossover with Superman and Action Comics, an homage to the Earth-2 Superman in the wake of events in the limited series Infinite Crisis.

For its last two years, The Adventures of Superman was written by Greg Rucka. His stories included the villain Ruin, the attempted assassination of Lois Lane and a number of Mister Mxyzptlk appearances.

Adventures of Superman volume 2
Adventures of Superman was relaunched on April 29, 2013. Unlike the previous volume, the new series is not set in the mainstream DC Universe continuity but instead features anthology style stories with rotating creative teams in the same format as the second Legends of the Dark Knight series. It is released as a digital-first comic with print publication to follow. The first story was to have been written by Orson Scott Card and drawn by Chris Sprouse and Karl Story. Card's participation in the project became an issue.  DC Comics responded to a petition about to be dropped with a statement that it supported freedom of expression and that the personal views of individuals associated with the company were not the views of the company. Illustrator Chris Sprouse left the project due to the media attention and some comic book stores announced a boycott. Card's Superman story was dropped and was replaced by a story written by Jeff Parker. The relaunched Adventures of Superman series came to an end with issue #17, released in September 2014.

Return to the original title
Superman volume 2 reached issue #226 (April 2006) and was then canceled as part of the linewide Infinite Crisis event. The Adventures of Superman was returned to its original title, Superman, with issue #650 (May 2006), as a part of the "One Year Later" banner. Superman had a crossover with Action Comics, titled "Up, Up and Away!" co-written by Geoff Johns and Kurt Busiek with art by Pete Woods. This storyline told of Clark Kent attempting to protect Metropolis without his powers until eventually regaining them. Busiek became the sole writer of the series with issue #654 (September 2006) and Carlos Pacheco became the series' artist. The series participated in the weekly series Countdown to Final Crisis, giving a different perspective on certain events shown in the weekly title, such as the events preceding the death of New God Lightray.

Busiek and Pacheco developed an extended storyline featuring Arion coming into conflict with Superman. The plotline concluded in Superman Annual #13. Alex Ross painted the covers for issues #675 (June 2008) through #685 (April 2009).

James Robinson replaced Busiek with issue #677 (August 2008). Robinson's run on the title began with "The Coming of Atlas" story arc and began a link between Superman, Action Comics, and Supergirl that started a long-form narrative with the New Krypton event. The majority of Robinson's run featured Mon-El and the Guardian as the featured characters, while Superman himself had gone to live on the planet New Krypton. Robinson's last full issue was #699, tying into Last Stand of New Krypton, and he finished his run in a short story in issue #700 (August 2010) that returned Superman to Earth. Superman #700 also saw writer J. Michael Straczynski, a self-professed Superman fan who feels a personal connection to the character, take over writing duties with a short story in the issue, and his run on the title began with issue #701. Artist Eddy Barrows, a previous Action Comics artist and one of the artists on the War of the Supermen event, was Straczynski's artistic collaborator. Straczynski and Barrows began a year-long story entitled "Grounded" that sees Superman begin a long walk across the United States to regain the connection with his adopted home that he feels he lost while away on New Krypton. The series ended with issue #714 (October 2011), prior to DC Comics' The New 52 company wide reboot and relaunch.

Superman volume 3
DC Comics launched Superman volume 3 with issue #1 in September 2011 (cover dated November 2011), as part of The New 52. The first three issues saw George Pérez doing the scripting and breakdowns. Dan Jurgens began to co-write and draw Superman with Keith Giffen. Their first issue was #7 (May 2012). As of September 2012's issue #0, Scott Lobdell and Kenneth Rocafort became the creative team. John Romita Jr. draw the Superman series in collaboration with writer Geoff Johns in 2014. Romita Jr.'s Superman pencils were inked by Klaus Janson. Superman's secret identity as Clark Kent was revealed to the world in a storyline by writer Gene Luen Yang in 2015. This series ended its run with the release of issue #52 (July 2016).

Superman volume 4
As part of the DC Rebirth relaunch, Superman Volume 4 began with issue #1 in June 2016 (cover dated August 2016), including a one-shot DC Rebirth special Superman: Rebirth #1. Peter J. Tomasi and Patrick Gleason are the creative team, with the Superman series shipping twice-monthly. This volume's 34th issue was also the 800th issue of the Superman series as a whole, with a variant cover done by Tony S. Daniel to commemorate the occasion. The series ended its run with issue #45 (April 2018).

Superman volume 5
A fifth series under the direction of Brian Michael Bendis was released in July 2018 and ended its run in June 2021 with issue #32.

Superman: Son of Kal-El

Superman: Son of Kal-El, written by Tom Taylor and art by John Timms, replaced the Superman title in July 2021. The monthly series conclude in December 2022, with 18 issues and one annual. The series follows the adventures of Jon Kent, the son of Superman and Lois Lane, as he is entrusted with the protection of Earth. Jon came out as bisexual in the fifth issue of the series, starting a relationship with his male reporter friend Jay Nakamura.

Superman volume 6
A new ongoing Superman comic book series launched in February 2023 from writer Joshua Williamson and artist Jamal Campbell.

Annuals
The Superman series had Annuals published since 1960. Eight issues of Superman Annual were published starting in winter 1960. An additional four issues were published from 1983 to 1986 and the numbering continued from the 1960 series. Superman Annual #11 (1985) featured the story "For the Man Who Has Everything" by Alan Moore and Dave Gibbons. When the original Superman series was retitled as The Adventures of Superman, both it and Superman (vol. 2) received Annuals relaunched with #1 issues. The Adventures of Superman Annual ran for nine issues from 1987 to 1997. After The Adventures of Superman was restored to its original title as Superman, its Annuals continued the (vol. 2) Annuals.

Collected editions

Superman
 Superman Archives
 Vol. 1 collects Superman #1–4, 272 pages, 1989, 
 Vol. 2 collects Superman #5–8, 272 pages, 1990, 
 Vol. 3 collects Superman #9–12, 272 pages, 1991, 
 Vol. 4 collects Superman #13–16, 224 pages, 1994, 
 Vol. 5 collects Superman #17–20, 224 pages, March 2000, 
 Vol. 6 collects Superman #21–24, 216 pages, July 2003, 
 Vol. 7 collects Superman #25–29, 240 pages, April 2006, 
 Vol. 8 collects Superman #30–35, 256 pages, October 2010, 
 Superman: The Golden Age Omnibus
 Vol. 1: includes Superman #1–7; 784 pages, June 2013, 
 Vol. 2: includes Superman #8-15; 750 pages, July 2016, 
 Vol. 3: includes Superman #16–24; 720 pages, December 2016, 
 Vol. 4: includes Superman #25-33; 768 pages, May 2017, 
 Vol. 5: includes Superman #34-42; 768 pages, January 2018, 
The Superman Chronicles
 Vol. 1: includes Superman #1; 208 pages, February 2006, 
 Vol. 2: includes Superman #2–3; 192 pages, February 2007, 
 Vol. 3: includes Superman #4–5; 192 pages, August 2007, 
 Vol. 4: includes Superman #6–7; 192 pages, February 2008, 
 Vol. 5: includes Superman #8–9; 192 pages, August 2008, 
 Vol. 6: includes Superman #10–11; 192 pages, February 2009, 
 Vol. 7: includes Superman #12–13; 168 pages, July 2009, 
 Vol. 8: includes Superman #14–15; 168 pages, April 2010, 
 Vol. 9: includes Superman #16–17; 192 pages, June 2011, 
 Vol. 10: includes Superman #18–19; 168 pages, September 2012, 
 Superman: The Man of Tomorrow Archives
 Vol. 1 includes Superman #122–126, 224 pages, May 2005, 
 Vol. 2 includes Superman #127–131, 240 pages, March 2006, 
 Vol. 3 includes Superman #132–139, 408 pages, July 2013,  
 Showcase Presents: Superman
 Vol. 1 includes Superman #122–133, 560 pages, October 2005, 
 Vol. 2 includes Superman #134–145, 560 pages, June 2006, 
 Vol. 3 includes Superman #146–156; Superman Annual #3–4, 560 pages, April 2007, 
 Vol. 4 includes Superman #157–166, 544 pages, September 2008, 
 Adventures of Superman: José Luis García-López collects Superman #294, 301–302, 307–309 and 347; DC Comics Presents #1–4, 17, 20, 24, and 31, and All-New Collectors' Edition #C-54, 360 pages, April 2013, .
 Adventures of Superman: Gil Kane collects Superman #367, 372, 375; Superman Special #1–2; Action Comics #539–541, 544–546 and 551–554; and DC Comics Presents Annual #3, 392 pages, January 2013, .
 Superman: Up, Up, and Away! includes Superman #650–653, 192 pages, September 2006, 
 Superman: Camelot Falls
 Vol. 1 collects Superman #654–658, 128 pages, July 2008, 
 Vol. 2 collects Superman #662–664, 667 and Superman Annual #13, 128 pages, March 2009, 
 Superman: The Third Kryptonian collects Superman #668–670 and the backup story from Superman Annual #13, 128 pages, October 2008, 
 Superman: Redemption includes Superman #659 and 666, 112 pages, January 2008, 
 Superman: 3-2-1 Action includes Superman #665, 160 pages, April 2008, 
 Superman: Shadows Linger collects Superman #671–675, 144 pages, January 2009, 
 Superman: The Coming of Atlas collects Superman #677–680 and 1st Issue Special #1, 128 pages, April 2010, 
 Superman: New Krypton
 Vol. 1 includes Superman #681, 176 pages, May 2009, 
 Vol. 2 includes Superman #682–683, 160 pages, September 2009, 
 Superman: Mon-El
 Vol. 1 collects Superman #684–690, 224 pages, February 2011, 
 Vol. 2 collects Superman #692–697; Superman Annual #14; and Superman Secret Files and Origins 2009, 224 pages, October 2011, 
 Superman: Codename: Patriot includes Superman #691, 144 pages, April 2011, 
 Superman: Nightwing and Flamebird Vol. 2 includes Superman #696, 208 pages, October 2011, 
 Superman: Last Stand of New Krypton
 Vol. 1 includes Superman #698, 168 pages, November 2011, 
 Vol. 2 includes Superman #699, 128 pages, March 2012, 
 Superman: Grounded
 Vol. 1 collects Superman #700–706, 168 pages, May 2012, 
 Vol. 2 collects Superman #707–711 and 713–714, 168 pages, December 2012,

The Adventures of Superman
 Superman: The Man of Steel
 Vol. 2 includes The Adventures of Superman #424–426, 224 pages, November 2003, 
 Vol. 3 includes The Adventures of Superman #427–429, 208 pages, October 2004, 
 Vol. 4 includes The Adventures of Superman #430–431, 192 pages, September 2005, 
 Vol. 5 includes The Adventures of Superman #432–435, 208 pages, November 2006, 
 Vol. 6 includes The Adventures of Superman Annual #1, 208 pages, March 2008, 
 Vol. 7 includes The Adventures of Superman #436–438, 192 pages, February 2013, 
 Vol. 8 includes The Adventures of Superman #439–440, 240 pages, January 2014, 
 Vol. 9 includes The Adventures of Superman #441–444, 280 pages, November 2016, 
 Lois & Clark: The New Adventures of Superman includes The Adventures of Superman #445, 462 and 466, 190 pages, July 1994, 
 Superman: Exile includes The Adventures of Superman #451–456, 304 pages, June 1998, 
 Superman: Eradication! (The Origin of the Eradicator) includes The Adventures of Superman #460, 464–465, 160 pages, November 1995, 
 Superman: Krisis of the Krimson Kryptonite includes The Adventures of Superman #472–473, 176 pages, September 1996, 
 Superman: Time and Time Again includes The Adventures of Superman #476–478, 206 pages, October 1994, 
 Superman: Panic in the Sky includes The Adventures of Superman #488–489, 188 pages, March 1993, 
 The Death of Superman includes The Adventures of Superman #496–497, 172 pages, January 1993, 
 World Without a Superman includes The Adventures of Superman #498–500, 240 pages, April 1993, 
 The Return of Superman includes The Adventures of Superman #500–505, 480 pages, September 1993, 
 The Death and Return of Superman Omnibus includes The Adventures of Superman #496–505, 784 pages, September 2007, 
 Superman: The Death of Clark Kent includes The Adventures of Superman #523–525, 320 pages, May 1997, 
 Superman: The Trial of Superman includes The Adventures of Superman #529–531, 272 pages, November 1997, 
 Superman: The Wedding and Beyond includes The Adventures of Superman #541, 192 pages, January 1998, 
 Superman: Transformed! includes The Adventures of Superman #542 and 545, 197 pages, April 1998, 
 Superman vs. the Revenge Squad includes The Adventures of Superman #539, 542–543, 144 pages, February 1999, 
 Superman: No Limits! includes The Adventures of Superman #574, 212 pages, November 2000, 
 Superman: Endgame includes The Adventures of Superman #576, 180 pages, January 2001, 
 Superman: 'Til Death Do Us Part includes The Adventures of Superman #577–578, 228 pages, December 2001, 
 Superman: Critical Condition includes The Adventures of Superman #579–580, 196 pages, February 2003, 
 Superman: Emperor Joker includes The Adventures of Superman #582–583, 256 pages, January 2007, 
 Superman: President Lex includes The Adventures of Superman #581, 244 pages, June 2003, 
 Superman: Our Worlds at War
 Vol. 1 includes The Adventures of Superman #593–594, 264 pages, September 2002, 
 Vol. 2 includes The Adventures of Superman #595, 264 pages, September 2002, 
 Superman: Our Worlds at War Complete Edition includes The Adventures of Superman #593–595, 512 pages, June 2006, 
 Superman: Return to Krypton includes The Adventures of Superman #589, 606, 212 pages, February 2004, 
 Superman: Ending Battle includes The Adventures of Superman #608–609, 192 pages, May 2009, 
 Superman: Godfall includes The Adventures of Superman #625–626, 112 pages, September 2004, 
 Superman: Unconventional Warfare includes The Adventures of Superman #627–632 and backup stories from #625–626, 160 pages, February 2005, 
 Superman: That Healing Touch includes The Adventures of Superman #633–638, 168 pages, August 2005, 
 Day of Vengeance includes The Adventures of Superman #639, 224 pages, December 2005, 
 Superman: Ruin Revealed includes The Adventures of Superman #640–641, 644–647, 139 pages, 
 Superman: Sacrifice includes The Adventures of Superman #642–643, 192 pages, January 2006, 
 Superman: Infinite Crisis includes The Adventures of Superman #648–649, 128 pages, July 2006,

The New 52
 Superman
 Vol. 1: What Price Tomorrow? collects Superman (vol. 3) #1–6, 144 pages, November 2012, 
 Vol. 2: Secrets and Lies collects Superman (vol. 3) #7–12 and Superman Annual (vol. 3) #1, 176 pages, July 2013, 
 Vol. 3: Fury at World's End collects Superman (vol. 3) #0, 13–17, 192 pages, January 2014, 
 Vol. 4: Psi-War collects Superman (vol. 3) #18-24, and Superman Annual (vol. 3) #2, 224 pages, August 2014, 
 Vol. 5: Under Fire collects Superman (vol. 3) #25-31, 176 pages, February 2015, 
 Vol. 6: The Men of Tomorrow collects Superman (vol. 3) #32-39, 256 pages, August 2015, 
 Vol. 1: Before Truth collects Superman (vol. 3) #40-44, 224 pages, April 2016,  
 Vol. 2: Return to Glory collects Superman (vol. 3) #45-52, 320 pages, October 2016, 
Relaunched Adventures of Superman series (2013-2014)
 Vol. 1: collects Adventures of Superman (vol. 2) #1-5, 168 pages, April 2014, 
 Vol. 2: collects Adventures of Superman (vol. 2) #6-10, 168 pages, October 2014, 
 Vol. 3: collects Adventures of Superman (vol. 2) #11-17, 160 pages, March 2015,

DC Rebirth
 Vol. 1: Son of Superman collects Superman (vol. 4) #1-6 and Superman: Rebirth #1, 176 pages, January 2017, 
 Vol. 2: Trials of the Super Son collects Superman (vol. 4) #7-13, 168 pages, April 2017, 
 Vol. 3: Multiplicity collects Superman (vol. 4) #14-17 and Superman Annual #1, 144 pages, August 2017, 
 Vol. 4: Black Dawn collects Superman (vol. 4) #20-26, 176 pages, November 2017, 
 Vol. 5: Hopes and Fears collects Superman (vol. 4) #27-32, 144 pages, April 2018, 
 Vol. 6: Imperius Lex collects Superman (vol. 4) #33-36 and #39-41, 168 pages, August 2018, 
 Vol. 7: Bizarroverse collects Superman (vol. 4) #42-45 and material from Superman Special #1, 156 pages, November 2018, 
Superman (vol. 4) has also been released in four deluxe hardcovers:
 Superman: Rebirth Deluxe Edition Book 1 collects Superman (vol. 4) #1-13 and Superman: Rebirth #1, 336 pages, September 2017, 
 Superman: Rebirth Deluxe Edition Book 2 collects Superman (vol. 4) #14-26 and Superman Annual #1, 360 pages, May 2018, 
 Superman: Rebirth Deluxe Edition Book 3 collects Superman (vol. 4) #27-36, 240 pages, December 2018, 
 Superman: Rebirth Deluxe Edition Book 4 collects Superman (vol. 4) #37-45, Superman Special #1 and a story from Action Comics #1000, 280 pages, May 2019,

DC Universe
 Vol. 1: The Unity Saga: Phantom Earth collects Superman (vol. 5) #1-6, 168 pages, February 2019, 
 Vol. 2: The Unity Saga: The House of El collects Superman (vol. 5) #7-15
 Vol. 3: The Truth Revealed collects Superman (vol. 5) #16-19, Superman: Heroes #1, Superman: Villains #1
 Vol. 4: Mythological collects Superman (vol. 5) #20-28
 Vol. 5: The One Who Fell collects Action Comics (vol. 1) #1029, Superman (vol. 5) #29-32

See also

Batman (comic book)
The Flash (comic book)
Green Lantern (comic book)
Wonder Woman (comic book)
List of DC Comics publications
List of Superman comics

References

External links
Superman sales figures for 1960–1987 at The Comics Chronicles.

DC Comics titles
1939 comics debuts
1986 comics endings
1987 comics debuts
2006 comics endings
2006 comics debuts
2011 comics endings
2011 comics debuts
2016 comics endings
2016 comics debuts
2018 comics endings
2018 comics debuts
Comics by Dan Jurgens
Comics by George Pérez
Comics by J. Michael Straczynski
Comics by Len Wein
Comics by Marv Wolfman
Comics by Paul Kupperberg
Comics by Peter J. Tomasi
Golden Age comics titles
Superman titles